Ciesielski (feminine: Ciesielska) is a Polish-language surname. Notable people with this surname include:

 Jerzy Ciesielski (1929–1970), Polish Roman Catholic figure
 Sævar Ciesielski, Icelander convicted in the Guðmundur and Geirfinnur case
 Tomasz Ciesielski (born 1979), Polish footballer
 Zbigniew Ciesielski (1934–2020), Polish mathematician

See also

References

Polish-language surnames